Oklahoma Central Railroad may refer to:
Oklahoma Central Railroad (1914–1942) or its predecessor, Oklahoma Central Railway (1905–14), predecessors of the Santa Fe
Oklahoma Central Railroad (–1988), switching line at El Reno